Sadalas III (Ancient Greek: Σαδάλας) was a king of the Odrysian kingdom of Thrace from 42 BC to 31 BC. He was possibly the son of Sadalas II.

See also 
List of Thracian tribes

References 

 
1st-century BC rulers in Europe
Thracian kings